Ignas is pro in a Lithuanian masculine given name. It may refer to:

Ignas Barkauskas (born  1988), Lithuanian diver
Ignas Brazdeikis (born 1999), Lithuanian basketball player
Ignas Budrys (1933–1999), Lithuanian painter 
Ignas Darkintis (born 1989), Lithuanian rugby union player
Ignas Dedura (born 1978), Lithuanian football player
Ignas Jonynas (1884–1954), Lithuanian diplomat and historian
Ignas Malocha (born 1960), Tanzanian politician
Ignas Navakauskas (born 1989), Lithuanian sprint canoeist
Ignas Plūkas (born 1993), Lithuanian footballer
Ignas Staškevičius (born 1970), Lithuanian businessman

Masculine given names
Lithuanian masculine given names